Forever and a Day is the debut album of Idols winner Karin Kortje.

Track listing
 "Forever and a Day"
 "You Don't Know"
 "Everything I Do"
 "How I Wish"
 "I'm Better With You"
 "I'll Be Gone"
 "Stealing"
 "Some People"
 "Nothing Left But The Music"
 "Never Never Never"
 "If I Can't Have You"
 "Back in Your Arms"
 "I'm So Ready"

References
http://www.last.fm/music/Karin+Kortje/Forever+And+A+Day

2006 debut albums